The Ponte Altinate is a Roman bridge in Padua, Italy. The late Republican bridge once spanned a branch of the Brenta river whose course is today followed by the street Riviera del Ponti Romani. The structure is located at the crossing with Via Altinate and, lying underground, completely obstructed from view by the modern pavement.

The rise-to-span ratio is 1:4 for the main arch and 1:3.7 for the two lateral ones, while the ratio of pier thickness to clear span is c. 1:5.

Close by is the similarly inaccessible Roman bridge Ponte San Lorenzo which is open to visitors at fixed hours though.

See also 
 Ponte Molino
 List of Roman bridges

References

Sources 
 

Roman bridges in Italy
Roman segmental arch bridges
Deck arch bridges
Stone bridges in Italy
Bridges completed in the 1st century BC
Bridges in Padua
1st-century BC establishments in the Roman Republic